Franz Johannes Gleißner (1759 – 18 September 1818) was a German lithographer and composer. In the late 18th century, he met Alois Senefelder, with whom he collaborated for approximately 30 years using lithography as a method of reproduction to print music scores.  Using the songs composed by Gleißner, Senefelder demonstrated that lithography could be successfully used for music publication.

Gleißner's compositions include masses, the oratorio Lazarus, about thirteen symphonies, much chamber music, and some stage works.

In 1803, Gleißner made a catalog of Wolfgang Amadeus Mozart's manuscripts in Constanze's estate.

Footnotes

References
 p. 432 Duckles (1980) Vincent. London "Gleissner, Franz" in The New Grove Dictionary of Music and Musicians Macmillan Vol. 7
 pp. 943–944 Duckles, Twyman (2001) Vincent, Michael. New York "Gleissner, Franz" in The New Grove Dictionary of Music and Musicians 2nd Ed. Vol. 9 Macmillan

External links
 
  "Franz Gleissner: ein bayerischer Musiker und die Erfindung des Steindruckes" at Kirchenmusik in Benediktbeuern website

1759 births
1818 deaths
German composers
German lithographers